Simon Gärdenfors (born 23 March 1978) is a Swedish cartoonist, rapper, television presenter, and radio host.

His comics are drawn in a round, icon-like style, although their content is often realistic or autobiographical. He has published three graphic novels, as well as several short pieces for the Swedish comic anthology Galago.

Gärdenfors is most known for his comic about Per-Olof Svensson, the formerly accused, subsequently acquitted murderer of then Swedish Minister for Foreign Affairs Anna Lindh. According to Gärdenfors, he had met Svensson during a stay in Lund, and included him in his comic as a subject of mythomania. In 2005, Gärdenfors has had his book Lura mig (Fool Me) published, containing interviews with different people he considers mythomaniacs, and his comments about the media coverage of the event.

Alongside his childhood friend Calle Thörn, he is also a member of the underground hip-hop duo Las Palmas. The duo received airplay in 2004 with the song "Spökskrivare" ("Ghostwriter"), claiming that it actually was Gärdenfors who had written all famous hip-hop songs. He is also part of an additional hip-hop project, Far & Son, featuring Frej Larsson of Slagsmålsklubben.

His graphic novel The 120 Days of Simon (Simons 120 dagar) was published in English translation by Top Shelf Productions in 2010.

In 2008, Gärdenfors hosted a six-episode series on ZTV titled The Simon Gärdenfors skräpkultur-show (The Simon Gärdenfors Junk Culture Show), with each episode focusing on a different category of "junk culture" such as candy wrappers, comics, and pinball.

His father, Peter Gärdenfors, is a philosopher and professor of Cognitive Science at Lund University.

Published works
 2002 - Turist (Tourist)
 2005 - Lura mig! (Fool Me!)
 2008 - Simons 120 dagar (published in English as The 120 Days of Simon in 2010)
 2009 - Nybuskis (Neo-Farce)
 2012 - Död kompis (Dead Friend)
 2014 - Hobby

References

Swedish cartoonists
1978 births
Living people